Elka Park is a hamlet in Greene County, New York, United States. Elka Park has a post office with ZIP code 12427, which opened on August 9, 1893.

References

Hamlets in Greene County, New York
Hamlets in New York (state)